C. S. Lewis Academy is a private Christian school in Newberg, Oregon, United States.

Academics

Its mission statement is "C.S. Lewis Academy is committed to providing an education that is challenging and responsive to individual needs; preparing students for life in a safe, nurturing environment that fosters character development and spiritual growth based on Biblical truth."

The school was accredited by the Association of Christian Schools International in 1999, by the Northwest Association of Accredited Schools in 1990 which has merged with AdvancED as of 2012.

In 2013, the high school and middle school portion of the school moved to 1605 N College St in Newberg, followed by the elementary school in 2016. This marks the first time the K-12 grades were all on the same campus together.

References

Christian schools in Oregon
High schools in Yamhill County, Oregon
Educational institutions established in 1985
Private middle schools in Oregon
Private elementary schools in Oregon
Private high schools in Oregon
1985 establishments in Oregon